Tekheyt may refer to:
 Tekheyt-e Olya,  a village in Jarahi Rural District, Khuzestan Province, Iran
 Tekheyt-e Sofla, another village in Jarahi Rural District, Khuzestan Province, Iran